C/2021 O3 (PanSTARRS) was an Oort cloud comet, discovered on 26 July 2021 by the Pan-STARRS sky survey.

The comet was expected to reach apparent magnitude 5 by late April 2022, while being only 15 degrees from the Sun. While near perihelion the comet was dimmer than expectations. It was faintly visible in STEREO/SECCHI COR2-A on 27 April 2022. Observations by Lowell Discovery Telescope on April 29 in the twilight detected a diffuse glow with a magnitude of 9 where the comet was expected to be, indicating that the comet nucleus disintergrated during perihelion. As a dynamically new comet from the Oort cloud there was a high risk of disintegration.

Orbit

With a short observation arc of 7 days, the Minor Planet Center used an assumed eccentricity of 1.0 for the orbit solution. With an observation arc of 53 days, JPL Horizons shows both an inbound and outbound eccentricity greater than 1.

C/2021 O3 probably took millions of years to arrive from the outer Oort cloud and, had it survived, may have been fated to be ejected from the Solar System.

References

External links 
 

Non-periodic comets
Discoveries by Pan-STARRS
20210726
Oort cloud
Destroyed comets